Francesca Borri (born 1980) is an Italian journalist whose reportage focuses on armed conflicts in the Maldives, Israel and Palestine, Kosovo, and Syria.

Life 
She studied in Florence and Pisa and has worked in the Balkans and the Middle East as a human rights officer. Her first book Non aprire mai (2008) was a study of the conflict in Kosovo. 
In 2010, she published a book on the Israel-Palestine conflict titled Qualcuno con cui parlare. Israeliani e Palestinesi (Someone to talk to. Israelis and Palestinians).

In 2012, she began reporting from Syria. In 2016, Borri's book on the Syrian civil war, La guerra dentro, was translated by Anne Milano Appel and published by Seven Stories Press under the title Syrian Dust. In 2018, Seven Stories published a second translation of Borri's work, Destination Paradise, about the presence of Jihadists in the Maldives. 

Borri writes regularly for Il Fatto Quotidiano, Internazionale, and Al-Monitor.

Works
Passaggi / [La meridiana], la meridiana, 2008, 
Qualcuno con cui parlare: israeliani e palestinesi, Manifestolibri, 2010, 
La guerra dentro, Bompiani, 2014, 
Syrian Dust: Reporting from the Heart of the Battle for Aleppo, Seven Stories Press, 2015, 
Destination Paradise: Among the Jihadists of the Maldives, Seven Stories Press, 2017,

References

Italian journalists
1980 births
Living people